Kurdamir is a city and the capital of the Kurdamir District of Azerbaijan. It is located in Aran Economic Region.

Geography 
The district shares borders with Agsu, Goychay, Ujar, Imishli, Sabirabad, Hajigabul and Zardab rayons. It has warm semi-arid climate. The relief mainly consists of lowland plains that are below the sea level. The river network is very sparse (Girdiman and Aghsu rivers flowing through this region), mainly Gray-Brown Earth and Gray soils are commonly found under Kserofit bushes and Tugay forests, semi-arid deserts. Wild boars, wolves, foxes, jackals, pheasants, francolins, wild ducks and geese, etc. constitute the fauna of the district. Moreover, the Shirvan collector passing through the territory of the district. The improper human activities when using irrigation, outstanding run off precipitation, as well as the wind causes soil erosion in the region.

Climate 
Dry subtropical climate is mostly characteristic for the region. These climates tend to have hot, sometimes extremely hot, summers and warm to cool winters, with some to minimal precipitation. rainless summers and wetter winters. Rainfall ranges from 430 mm-185, relative air humidity from 50 - 60% in summer, 75 - 80% during the winter months. The average temperature is 4.6 °C in January and 28 °C in July. The average annual temperature is 15.8 °C in the region. The highest temperature ever recorded in Kurdamir was 44 °C (2000).

History 
Kurdamir district was founded in 1930 as the center of the Aran economic region. In 1963, due to the creation of the party committees of the kolkhoz-sovkhoz production department, the Agsu and Kurdamir regions were united and in January of the same year the Kurdamir kolkhoz-sovkhoz party committee was established. In 1964, according to the plenum of Central Committee of the Communist Party of the Azerbaijan SSR the new system was abolished, the old structure was restored, Kurdamir and Agsu districts were separated and each started to function as an independent region. The share of industry in economy of Kurdemir began to rise in 1883 after the establishment of Baku-Tbilisi railway line. As the railway line passed through Kurdamir, it also contributed the transportation of agricultural products on time and affected positively to the development of this field in the district. As a result of it, in 1884 Kurdemir's agricultural products were already sold in Russian markets. The all above factors led to formation of Kurdamir as a new administrative center. At the beginning of the twentieth century, Kurdamir was already the administrative center of Goychay region, and included 67 villages and migratory places. During the Democratic Republic of Azerbaijan, Kurdamir became an active center in liberation of Baku.. In 1920, the Soviet power was established in Kurdamir as well as in the whole of Azerbaijan. Kurdemir played a major role as an economic and cultural center during the Soviet era.

Economy 
The economy of the district is mainly based on agriculture. Cotton growing, grain growing, livestock, as well as viticulture and fishery are the important part of its economy. The share of poultry and livestock in the district are considered essential.

Agriculture 
The main agricultural outputs of region sugar beet, cotton growing, grain growing, as well as viticulture, fishery and dairy products related to livestock. In the Kurdamir region, 144 million 915.5 thousand AZN agricultural products were produced in 2017. The actual cost of gross output of agriculture increased by 18 million 941 thousand AZN or 13.1 percent compared to the previous year. Thus, 40.6% of the total output of the region fell to the share of agriculture. Last year the region produced 14,795 tons of potatoes, 22,550 tons of vegetables, 69,833 tons of melons, 23 tons of groundwater, 875 tons of sugar beet, 20 tons of sunflower, 100 tons of soybeans, 103 tons of buckwheat, 26176 tons of fruit and 2967 tons of grapes. More than 3,000 hectares of pomegranate gardens have been planted in the district, and more than 500 hectares of these gardens have been cultivated. Recently, the number of cattle has increased to 64785 and the number of sheep and goats has increased to 135861. In the first half of this year, meat production increased by 17.7%, dairy production by 6.7%, egg production increased by 64.5%, wool production by 21.5%. In the fall of last year, 45040 hectares of grain, including 16072 hectares of wheat, 28,968 hectares of barley were sown.

Industry

Transport

Rail

Kürdəmir sits on one of the Azerbaijani primary rail lines running east–west connecting the capital, Baku, with the rest of the country. The Kars–Tbilisi–Baku railway will run along the line through the city. The railway provides both human transportation and transport of goods and commodities such as oil and gravel.

Kürdəmir's Central Railway Station is the terminus for national and international rail links to the city. The Kars–Tbilisi–Baku railway, which will directly connect Turkey, Georgia and Azerbaijan, began to be constructed in 2007 and is scheduled for completion in 2015. The completed branch will connect the city with Tbilisi in Georgia, and from there trains will continue to Akhalkalaki, and Kars in Turkey.

References

External links
 

Populated places in Kurdamir District
1938 establishments in Azerbaijan